In the 2007-2008 season, Unión Deportiva Almería played in two competitions: La Liga and the Copa del Rey. It was their first season in the top flight since their foundation in 1989, having secured promotion from the 2006–07 Segunda División as runners-up. La Liga football returned to Almería for the first time since their predecessor club, AD Almería, were relegated after the 1980–81 season.

Squad
Retrieved on 21 December 2020

Out on loan

Almería B players

Retrieved on 21 December 2020

Transfers

In

Out

Player statistics

Squad stats 
Last updated on 21 December 2020.

|-
|colspan="14"|Players who have left the club after the start of the season:

|}

Top Scorers
Updated on 21 December 2020

Disciplinary Record
Updated on 21 December 2020

Season Results

La Liga

Results summary

Matches

Copa del Rey

Round of 32

Levante won 3–2 on aggregate

References

Almeria
UD Almería seasons